Judd Henkes (born 2001) is an American snowboarder who competes in slopestyle and big air.

Career
Henkes won a bronze medal in slopestyle at the FIS Freestyle Ski and Snowboarding World Championships 2019. He competed at the FIS Freestyle Ski and Snowboarding World Championships 2017, where he reached the semi final in big air. He won a silver medal in slopestyle at the 2017 FIS Snowboarding Junior World Championships.

References

External links

2001 births
Living people
American male snowboarders
21st-century American people